Richard Anthony Cooper (born 27 September 1979) is an English football coach, manager and former footballer. He is currently Academy Manager at Mansfield Town after a spell with Eastwood Town where he was assistant manager.

Prior to his coaching role, Cooper played for Nottingham Forest, York City and Alfreton Town.

Following an injury which curtailed his footballing career, and prior to taking on his role as coach at Mansfield Town, he also worked as a business development manager.
In October 2020, Cooper was named as interim manager of Mansfield Town.

References

External links

1979 births
Living people
Footballers from Nottingham
English footballers
Nottingham Forest F.C. players
York City F.C. players
Eastwood Town F.C. players
Alfreton Town F.C. players
Association football midfielders
England youth international footballers
Mansfield Town F.C. managers
English football managers
Association football coaches
English Football League players